Five ships of the Royal Navy have been named HMS Aeolus, after one of a number of figures named Aeolus who appear in Greek mythology:

 was a 32-gun fifth-rate frigate launched in 1758. She was placed on harbour service in 1796, renamed HMS Guernsey in 1800, and was broken up in 1801.
HMS Aeolus (1800) was formerly the French ship Pallas, a 36-gun fifth rate, that a squadron captured in 1800 off the coast of France. She was renamed to Pique in 1801. She was sold for breaking up in 1819.
 was a 32-gun fifth-rate frigate launched in 1801 and broken up 1817.
 was a 46-gun fifth-rate frigate launched in 1825. She was used for harbour service from 1855 and was broken up in 1886.
 was an  second-class protected cruiser launched in 1891 and sold in 1914.

Notes

References
Citations

Bibliography

Royal Navy ship names